The  was an infantry division of the Imperial Japanese Army. It was formed on 12 July 1944 in Taipei city on Taiwan island. The nucleus for the formation was the 46th Independent mixed brigade casualties and local recruits. Also, the 249th infantry regiment was formed primarily from Takasago men.

Action
The 66th division was permanently assigned to the 10th area army (and to the 40th army in time it was based on Taiwan in early 1945). It was assigned to the coastal defence duties around Keelung, but did not see any combat until the surrender of Japan 15 August 1945.

The 102nd Independent Mixed Brigade was detached from the 66th division to guard an area on south of Hualien City in February 1945.

See also
 List of Japanese Infantry Divisions
 Independent Mixed Brigades (Imperial Japanese Army)

Notes and references

 Madej, W. Victor. Japanese Armed Forces Order of Battle, 1937-1945 [2 vols]
Allentown, PA: 1981
This article incorporates material from Japanese Wikipedia page 第66師団 (日本軍), accessed 18 June 2016

Japanese World War II divisions
Infantry divisions of Japan
Military units and formations established in 1944
Military units and formations disestablished in 1945
1944 establishments in Japan
1945 disestablishments in Japan